The year 1897 in architecture involved some significant events.

Events
 April 3 – Vienna Secession group founded by Otto Wagner, Joseph Maria Olbrich and Josef Hoffmann among others.
 David Ewart succeeds Thomas Fuller as Chief Dominion Architect of the Government of Canada.
 James Knox Taylor becomes Supervising Architect of the United States Department of the Treasury.

Buildings and structures

Buildings

 May 1
 Ny Carlsberg Glyptotek art museum, designed by Wilhelm Dahlerup, opens in Copenhagen.
 Tennessee Centennial Exposition opens in Nashville, with a temporary pyramid for Memphis, TN and a copy of the Parthenon, which will be rebuilt of permanent materials in the 1920s.
 May 12 – The new Oxford Town Hall, designed by Henry Hare, is officially opened in England.
 May 16 – The Teatro Massimo is inaugurated in Palermo; it is the largest opera theatre in Italy and the third in Europe.
 November 1 – The Library of Congress Building in Washington, D.C., designed by Paul J. Pelz, is opened.
 Christmas – The Cathedral of St. Vincent de Paul, Tunis, is completed.
 The Secession Building, Vienna, designed by Joseph Maria Olbrich is completed in Austria.
 Glasgow School of Art, designed by Charles Rennie Mackintosh, is begun in Scotland.
 Arts and Crafts movement houses in England:
 Long Copse, Ewhurst, Surrey, designed by Alfred Hoare Powell, built.
 Munstead Wood, designed by Edwin Lutyens for Gertrude Jekyll, begun.
 The Flatiron Building of Atlanta, Georgia, United States is completed, five years before New York City's more famous structure.
 First Church of Christ, Scientist (Chicago, Illinois), designed by Solon Spencer Beman, is built.
 The Battenberg Mausoleum, Sofia, designed by Hermann Mayer, is completed.
 The Weaver building, a mill at Swansea in Wales, becomes the first building in the United Kingdom to be constructed from reinforced concrete, by L. G. Mouchel to Hennebique patents.
 Dresden Hauptbahnhof railway station in Germany, designed by Ernst Giese and Paul Weidner, is completed.
 Restoration and remodelling of Castelldefels Castle in Spain by Enric Sagnier is completed.

Awards
 RIBA Royal Gold Medal – Pierre Cuypers.

Births
 January 2 – William Henry Harrison, American architect working in Whittier, California (died 1988)
 January 23 – Margarete Schütte-Lihotzky, Austrian architect (died 2000)
 February 11 – Jacob Christie Kielland, Norwegian architect (died 1972)
 February 25 – Elisabeth Coit, American architect (died 1987)
 April 18 – Charles N. Agree, American architect working in Detroit (died 1982)
 May 15 – Rudolf Schwarz, German architect (died 1961)
 August 16 – Helge Thiis, Norwegian architect and restorer (died 1972)
 September 9 – Nancy Lancaster, née Perkins, American-born interior decorator (died 1994)
 F. X. Velarde, English Catholic church architect (died 1960)

Deaths
 January 10 – David Brandon, Scottish-born architect (born 1813)
 March 25 – Charles Eliot, American landscape architect (born 1859)
 May 6 – George Gilbert Scott, Jr., English architect (born 1839)
 June 22 – William Mason, New Zealand architect (born 1810)
 December 11 – John Loughborough Pearson, British architect (born 1817)
 William Lang, American architect (born 1846)

References